Jayankondam is a 
Municipality in Ariyalur district of Tamil Nadu in India. As of 2022, the town had a population of 45,000.

Huge amounts of lignite deposits have been found here and power projects have been initiated by the Neyveli Lignite Corporation. This town has more than 25 temples of various historical periods in the vicinity. The existing Government Higher Secondary School at Jayankondam is as the old as the town and has nearly 2000 Students to its name.

Location
Jayankondam is well-connected with roadways. The national highway NH-81 passes through this town, connects Chidambaram and Tiruchirapalli. The state highway SH-140 which connects Virudachalam with Kumbakonam passes through this town. Chennai is located at the distance of  247 km. Kumbakonam is to the south, around 29 km away from Jayankondam via the Neelathanallur-Mathanathur bridge. Ariyalur is 38 km to the west. Viruthachalam is 36 km to the north and Chidambaram is 50 km to the east.

Jayankondam Town limit extends over an area of 28 km2.

Demographics

According to 2011 census, Jayankondam had a population of 33,945 with a sex-ratio of 1,031 females for every 1,000 males, much above the national average of 929. A total of 3,520 were under the age of six, constituting 1,866 males and 1,654 females. Scheduled Castes and Scheduled Tribes accounted for 17.88% and 2.06% of the population respectively. The average literacy of the town was 72.%, compared to the national average of 72.99%. The town had a total of : 8664 households. There were a total of 12,359 workers, comprising 611 cultivators, 1,386 main agricultural labourers, 1,004 in house hold industries, 7,592 other workers, 1,766 marginal workers, 87 marginal cultivators, 736 marginal agricultural labourers, 329 marginal workers in household industries and 614 other marginal workers. As per the religious census of 2011, Jayankondam (M) had 92.63% Hindus, 4.53% Muslims, 2.42% Christians, 0.06% Sikhs, 0.01% Buddhists, 0.01% Jains, 0.31% following other religions and 0.03% following no religion or did not indicate any religious preference.

History
Jayankondacholapuram is full name of Jayankondam. Original name is Nellimanagramam. The place was renamed as Jayankondacholapuram (ஜெயங்கொண்டசோழபுரம்) during the period of King Rajendracholan (ராஜேந்திரசோழன்) as they (Rajendra and his son) were victorious in many wars and campaigns. Jayankondam was established as town panchayat during British rule. Jayankondam was upgraded as second municipality of Perambalur district after Perambalur.

Administration and politics
Jayankondam is second grade municipality. Jayankondam comes under the Jayankondam State Assembly Constituency and it elect a member to the Tamil Nadu Legislative Assembly once every five years. Before 2009 Jayankondam came under Perambalur Lok sabha constituency. After 2009 Jayankondam comes under Chidambaram Lok sabha constituency.

Transportation
NH81 - Trichy - Jayankondam - Chidambaram, SH140 - Kumbakonam - Jayankondam - Virudhachalam, NH36 - Kumbakonam - Vikravandi, SH139 Jayankondam - Ariyalur, are major roads via Jayankondam. Jayankondam busstand is located in centre of town. TNSTC Jayankondam branch is under Trichy region of Kumbakonam Corporation. Government, Private buses operated to nearby towns Kumbakonam, Mayiladudurai, Virudhachalam, Trichy, Chidambaram, Cuddalore, Puducherry, Neyveli, Thanjavur, Ariyalur, Perambalur, Thuraiyur, Salem, Chennai, Coimbatore, Tiruppur, Palani, Madurai, Hosur, Banglore from Jayankondam busstand. Nearest Railway stations are Virudhachalam Junction railway station, located 40 km away, Ariyalur Railway station, located 38 km away, Kumbakonam Railway station, located 30 km away. Nearest Airport is Tiruchirappalli International Airport, located 98 km away. Nearest seaport is Karaikal port.

Places near Jayankondam
Gangaikonda Cholapuram capital of the Chola dynasty in c. 1025 during the reign of Rajendra Chola I, and served as the Chola capital for around 250 years. The village is the place near 8 km from Jayankondam. The city was founded by Rajendra Chola I to commemorate his victory over the Pala Dynasty. The name means The town of the chola who took over Ganga (water from Ganga) or who defeated (the kings near) Ganga. It is now a small village, its past eminence only remembered by the existence of the great Brihadisvara Temple. The temple has been recognised as a World Heritage site by UNESCO Chola empire included the whole of southern India to the river Thungabadhra in the north. For administrative and strategic purposes they built another capital and named it Gangaikondacholapuram.

Anaikarai is 15 km from Jayankondam. The Lower Anaicut built by Sir Arthur Cotton in 19th century AD across Coleroon, the major distributary of Cauvery, is said to be a replicated structure of Kallanai.[4] Nearly 2000 families live in Anaikarai with the main occupation of agriculture and fishing. It is well known and place for river fishes

PIN (Postal Index) Code for Jayankondam is 621802. Also the following nearby post offices share the same pin Angarayanallur, Chinnavalayam, Kaluvanthondi, Karadikulam, Kilakudiyiruppu, Periyavalayam and Sengunthapuram.

References

External links
 JKMOnline.com - Information about Jayankondam
 Jayankondam Town information
 Jayankondam People around the world cumminity site
 - Gangaikondacholapuram - Bragatheeswarar Temple - Site
 Jayankondam Facebook page

Cities and towns in Ariyalur district